Konji (also Romanized as Konjī; also known as Gonjī and Konchī) is a village in Deh Tall Rural District, in the Central District of Bastak County, Hormozgan Province, Iran. At the 2006 census, its population was 433, in 106 families.

References 

Populated places in Bastak County